The China Old Veterans Unification Party is a minor party in the Republic of China in Taiwan. It has had a very minor role in politics.

See also
 List of political parties in the Republic of China

References

Political parties in Taiwan